This is a season-by-season list of records compiled by St. Thomas (Minnesota) in men's ice hockey.

The University of St. Thomas (Minnesota) has appeared in two NCAA Championship games in its history, losing both.

Season-by-season results

Note: GP = Games played, W = Wins, L = Losses, T = Ties

* Winning percentage is used when conference schedules are unbalanced.

Footnotes

References

 
Lists of college men's ice hockey seasons in the United States
St. Thomas Tommies ice hockey seasons